The International Tennis Club of Washington plays real tennis on Prince's Court at the Regency Sport and Health Club in McLean, Virginia, 6 miles (10 km) from Washington, D.C.  Dedicated on October 11, 1997, Prince's is the only new real tennis venue to be constructed in the United States since the Racquet Club of Chicago was built in 1923.  (The Chicago court has since been renovated and renewed.)  The court, named after financial supporter and club co-founder Frederick H. Prince, features an 18 foot (5.5 m) high main wall made of plate glass giving spectators an unrivalled view of play.

Unusual features of the court include a large gong hung in the last gallery.

The head professional at Prince's Court is Ivan Ronaldson, whose father was formerly head professional at Hampton Court Palace.  The assistant professional is Phil Shannon.

See also
 Prince's Club

References

External links

 Official website: International Tennis Club of Washington

1997 establishments in Washington, D.C.
McLean, Virginia
Real tennis venues
Sports in Northern Virginia
Sports venues in Virginia
Sports venues in the Washington metropolitan area
Tennis in Virginia 
Tennis venues in Washington, D.C.
Tennis venues in the United States
Tennis clubs